The Night Without Pause is a 1931 German comedy film directed by Andrew Marton and Franz Wenzler and starring Sig Arno, Camilla Horn and Max Adalbert.

It was made by the German subsidiary of Universal Pictures in partnership with Tobis Film. The film's sets were designed by Fritz Maurischat and Gabriel Pellon. It is based on a popular stage farce by Ernst Bach and Franz Arnold, and was remade in 1952.

Synopsis
When his wife becomes suspicious that he is having an affair after discovering incriminating evidence, Julius Seipold manages to convince her that it is his innocuous assistant Max who is having a relationship. He invents a wild backstory about Max, which in turn fascinates the Julius Seipold's daughter Gertie.

Cast
 Sig Arno as Max Stieglitz
 Camilla Horn as Letta Larbo
 Max Adalbert as Julius Seipold
 Ida Wüst as Regine Seipold
 Ilse Korseck as Gertie Seipold
 Paul Richter as Walter Reimann, Filmregisseur
 Willy Stettner as Heinz Fellner
 Annemarie Hase as Anna, Dienstmädchen
 Walter Steiner as Kinodirektor
 Karl Harbacher as Friseur
 Hans Richter as Piccolo
 Gustl Gstettenbaur as Bürolehrling bei Stieglitz

References

Bibliography

External links 
 

1931 films
1931 comedy films
Films of the Weimar Republic
German comedy films
1930s German-language films
Films directed by Andrew Marton
Universal Pictures films
Tobis Film films
German films based on plays
German black-and-white films
1930s German films